The Mampuram Mosque is a famous mosque located in Tirurangadi in the Malappuram District of Kerala, India.

Pilgrim center
Mampuram mosque is one of the most prominent pilgrim centers of Sunni Muslims of Kerala. Around 5,000 visitors arrive here daily.

 Working time: after subh prayer 
 Closing time: 20 minutes before magrib prayer

Weekly prayers
A Swalath Majlis is conducted every Thursday at the Dargah.

Festivals
An Uroos is conducted from the first to the seventh of Muharram month every year. The programs include talks on Islam and distribution of free food. The final day also has a big congregation where people from all over the world participate.

Image gallery

See also
Mappila
Sayyid Alavi Thangal
Sayid Fasal Pookoya Thangal

References

Mosques in Kerala
Religious buildings and structures in Malappuram district
Sunni mosques in India